Nima Mirzazad (born 27 February 1997) is an Iranian professional football player currently playing for Sepahan in the Persian Gulf Pro League.

Club career

Malavan
Mirzazad joined Malavan's senior team before the start of the 2014–15 season at the age of 17. Nima Mirzazad made his debut in Persian Gulf Pro League on 8 May 2016, against Saba Qom as Malavan's first goalkeeper, Hossein Hosseini, was injured. Nima was 19 years and 2 months and 10 days old on this day.

Statistics

International
Nima was invited Iran U19 team at the age of 17. He was invited to the senior national team camp by manager Carlos Queiroz at the age of 19.

References

External links
 Nima Mirzazad at Persianleague.com
 Nima Mirzazad at Iranleague.ir

1997 births
Living people
Iranian footballers
Persian Gulf Pro League players
Azadegan League players
Malavan players
Iran under-20 international footballers
People from Bandar-e Anzali
Association football goalkeepers
Nassaji Mazandaran players
Sportspeople from Gilan province